Alfred-Pellan (formerly Duvernay and Laval East) is a federal electoral district in Quebec, Canada, that has been represented in the House of Commons of Canada since 1968. Its population in 2006 was 104,765.

Geography
The district includes the neighbourhoods of Duvernay, Pont-Viau, Saint-François, Saint-Vincent-de-Paul and the eastern part of the neighbourhood of Vimont in the City of Laval.

The neighbouring ridings are Marc-Aurèle-Fortin, Terrebonne—Blainville, Montcalm, Honoré-Mercier, Ahuntsic, and Vimy.

Demographics
According to the Canada 2016 Census

 Languages: (2016) 64.4% French, 10.1% Italian, 7.3% English, 4.1% Arabic, 4.0% Spanish, 3.3% Creole, 1.3% Portuguese, 1.0% Romanian, 0.6% Vietnamese, 0.4% Kabyle, 0.3% Greek, 0.3% Khmer, 0.3% Turkish

History
The riding was created in 1968 from Laval and was known as Duvernay until 1990 when it became Laval East. Upon redistribution in 2003 it was renamed Alfred-Pellan after the famous Quebec artist Alfred Pellan. Also it lost a small part of its territory to the newly created Marc-Aurèle-Fortin riding.

The riding lost territory to Vimy and Marc-Aurèle-Fortin during the 2012 electoral redistribution.

Member of Parliament

This riding has elected the following Member of Parliament:

Election results

Alfred-Pellan, 2003 - present

Laval East, 1990 - 2003

Duvernay, 1966 - 1990

See also
 List of Canadian federal electoral districts
 Past Canadian electoral districts

References

Riding history from the Library of Parliament
Riding history for Laval East from the Library of Parliament
Riding history for Duvernay from the Library of Parliament
Campaign expense data from Elections Canada

Notes

Politics of Laval, Quebec
Quebec federal electoral districts
21st-century Canadian politicians